Chicken tikka masala is a dish consisting of roasted marinated chicken chunks (chicken tikka) in a spiced sauce. The sauce is usually creamy and orange-coloured. The dish was popularised by cooks from India living in Great Britain and is offered at restaurants around the world.

Composition
Chicken tikka masala is composed of chicken tikka, boneless chunks of chicken marinated in spices and yogurt that are roasted in an oven, served in a creamy sauce. A tomato and coriander sauce is common, but no recipe for chicken tikka masala is standard; a survey found that of 48 different recipes, the only common ingredient was chicken. The sauce usually includes tomatoes (frequently as purée), cream, coconut cream and a masala spice mix. The sauce and chicken pieces may be coloured orange using foodstuffs such as turmeric, paprika, tomato purée or with food dye.

Chicken tikka masala is similar to butter chicken, both in the method of creation and appearance.

Origins
The origin of the dish is not certain, but many sources attribute it to the South Asian community in Great Britain; some sources also cite Glasgow as the city of origin.

Chicken tikka masala may derive from butter chicken, a popular dish in the northern Indian subcontinent. The Multicultural Handbook of Food, Nutrition and Dietetics credits its creation to Bangladeshi migrant chefs in Britain in the 1960s. They developed and served a number of new inauthentic "Indian" dishes, including chicken tikka masala. 

Historians of ethnic food Peter and Colleen Grove discuss multiple claims regarding the origin of chicken tikka masala, concluding that the dish "was most certainly invented in Britain, probably by a Bangladeshi chef." They suggest that "the shape of things to come may have been a recipe for Shahi Chicken Masala in Mrs Balbir Singh’s Indian Cookery published in 1961."

Another explanation claims that it originated in a restaurant in Glasgow, Scotland. This version recounts how a British Pakistani chef, Ali Ahmed Aslam, proprietor of a restaurant in Glasgow, invented chicken tikka masala by improvising a sauce made from a tin of condensed tomato soup, and spices. Peter Grove challenged any claim that Aslam was the creator of the dish as it had already existed for several years before.     

Chef Anita Jaisinghani, a correspondent in the Houston Chronicle, wrote that "the most likely story is that the modern version was created during the early ’70s by an enterprising Indian chef near London" who used Campbell's tomato soup. However, restaurant owner Iqbal Wahhab claims that he and culinary historian Peter Grove fabricated the story of a chef using tomato soup to create chicken tikka masala  in order "to entertain journalists". 

Rahul Verma, a food critic who writes for The Hindu, claimed that the dish has its origins in the Punjab region.

Popularity
Chicken tikka masala is served in restaurants around the world.

According to a 2012 survey of 2,000 people in Britain, it was the country's second-most popular foreign dish to cook, after Chinese stir fry.

In 2001, British Foreign Secretary Robin Cook mentioned the dish in a speech acclaiming the benefits of Britain's multiculturalism, declaring:

See also
 Butter chicken, a mild curry dish of Indian origin
 Balti, a South Asian dish
 Chicken curry, a spiced chicken dish
 List of chicken dishes
 Mughlai cuisine
General Tso's chicken

References

Further reading
 Curry Club Tandoori and Tikka Dishes, Piatkus, London –  (1993)
Curry Club 100 Favourite Tandoori Recipes, Piatkus, London –  (1995)
 India: Food & Cooking, New Holland, London –  (2007)

British cuisine
Indian cuisine in the United Kingdom
Indian chicken dishes
Indian curries
Indian meat dishes
Pakistani curries
Pakistani chicken dishes
Bengali curries
Bengali cuisine
Bangladeshi cuisine
Sylheti cuisine
Bangladeshi cuisine in the United Kingdom
Chicken dishes
Punjabi cuisine
Desi cuisine
National dishes
Masalas
Curry in the United Kingdom